Cornell N. Dypski (September 23, 1931 – January 20, 2009) was a member of the Maryland Senate representing the 47th district and a member of the Maryland House of Delegates representing the 46th district.

Early life
Cornell N. Dypski was born and raised in a two-story rowhouse on Dillon Street in Baltimore on September 23, 1931. His father was an Austrian immigrant and his mother worked in a cannery in Canton. His father died from an automobile accident when he was a child. He graduated from the Baltimore Polytechnic Institute in 1950 and attended the University of Baltimore.

Career
Dypski worked as an insurance salesman. He also worked as a court constable. He then worked as an administrative officer at the Maryland Motor Vehicle Administration from 1972 to 1994.

He represented 47th District of the Maryland State Senate from 1975 to 1983. It was redistricted into the 46th District in 1983. In 1995, he was a member of the Governor's COmmission on Baltimore City Automobile-Insurance Rate Reduction. He also represented District 46 of the Maryland House of Delegates from January 14, 1987 to January 8, 2003.

He was a four year recipient of the Community Service Award for work as a chair of the United Charity Campaign.

Personal life
Dypski married Joyce Houtz. Together, they had one son: Michael C. Dypski.

Dypski was friends with fellow state senator Julian L. Lapides. His older brother, Raymond A. Dypski, was also a member of the Maryland House of Delegates in the 46th District in 1966.

Death
Dypski died on January 20, 2009, at Gilchrist Hospice Care in Hunt Valley, Maryland.

References

1931 births
2009 deaths
Politicians from Baltimore
Maryland state senators
Members of the Maryland House of Delegates
21st-century American politicians